Hardeep Singh Puri (born 15 February 1952) is an Indian politician and former Indian diplomat who is currently serving as the Minister of Petroleum and Natural Gas and Minister of Housing and Urban Affairs in the Government of India. He presently also holds the record as the longest serving Minister for Housing and Urban Affairs in history.

He is a 1974 batch Indian Foreign Service officer who served as the Permanent Representative of India to the United Nations from 2009 to 2013.

Puri joined the Bharatiya Janata Party in January 2014, and became a Member of Parliament in the Rajya Sabha from Uttar Pradesh in November, 2020. Earlier in May 2019, he had taken charge as the Minister of State (Independent Charge) for Housing and Urban Affairs and Civil Aviation and Minister of State for Commerce and Industry.

Previously, Puri has served as the chairman of the United Nations Security Council's Counter-Terrorism Committee from January 2011 to February 2013; and joined International Peace Institute as a senior advisor in June 2013. He presents Smart Solutions Challenge & Inclusive Cities Awards 2022.

Early life and education
Hardeep Singh Puri was born in Delhi. His father was a civil servant, and he attended boarding schools in India as his father was posted in countries where there were no options for English-language education. He is an alumnus of The Frank Anthony Public School, New Delhi. He earned a Bachelor of Arts in History and Master of Arts in History from Hindu College, University of Delhi. He worked as a lecturer of History at St. Stephen's College, Delhi.

Career

Civil service
Hardeep Puri has served as Joint secretary to the Government of India in the Ministry of External Affairs from 1994 to 1997, and from 1999 to 2002. He has also served as Joint secretary to the Government of India in Ministry of Defence from 1997 to 1999. He was India's ambassador to Brazil. He later served as Secretary to the Government of India (Economic Relations) in the  Ministry of External Affairs from 2009 to 2013.

Puri has been stationed at important diplomatic posts in Brazil, where he was ambassador, Japan, Sri Lanka, and the United Kingdom where he was Deputy High Commissioner. Between 1988 and 1991, he was the Coordinator of the UNDP/UNCTAD Multilateral Trade Negotiations Project to help Developing Countries in the Uruguay Round of Multilateral Trade Negotiations. He also served as the chairman of the United Nations Security Council Counter-Terrorism Committee from January 2011 to February 2013, and as President of the United Nations Security Council in August 2011, and, again, in November 2012.

Politics
Ambassador Puri joined the International Peace Institute as a senior advisor in June 2013.  He joined the Bharatiya Janata Party in January 2014, expressing admiration for the party's approach to national security.

He is serving as the Member of Rajya Sabha from Uttar Pradesh from 2018. Puri was inducted into the cabinet as the Minister of Housing and Urban Affairs, after Venkaiah Naidu was elevated to the post of Vice President of India in 2017. In May 2019, he contested from Amritsar as a BJP Candidate, but lost to Gurjeet Singh Aujla of the Congress.

In May 2019, Puri became the Minister of State (with Independent Charge) for Civil Aviation and Minister of State for Commerce and Industry.

In July 2021, he was promoted to the post of Union Minister of Petroleum and Natural Gas, along with Union Minister for Housing and Urban Affairs in the Second Modi ministry when there was a cabinet overhaul.

His ministry also holds the credit for the launch of the Central Vista Project, the physical revamp of Parliament of India in New Delhi. Even though the mission received baclashes and comments from the opposition, the project continued with the completion projected by 2024. 

In March 2022, during the 2022 Russian invasion of Ukraine, he was sent to the neighboring nation of Ukraine, Budapest in Hungary to assist coordination efforts. He was one of the minister in a special envoy of four ministers and successfully brought back 6711 students to India, following the Operation Ganga initiative.

Electoral performance

Personal life
Hardeep Singh Puri is married to Ambassador Lakshmi Puri, of the Indian Foreign Service, and, later, the United Nations cadre, who is a former Assistant Secretary-General of the United Nations and a former Deputy Executive Director of UN Women. They have two daughters. His brother, Pradeep Puri, is an IAS officer of the 1979 batch, who played an instrumental role in the construction of the DND Flyway. He is a former member of INC.

Books, research papers and journals
Hardeep is a published author of several books, research papers, and journals. Included below is a selection of his works:

Books
 Perilous Interventions: The Security Council and the Politics of Chaos (Publisher: HarperCollins, 2016)
 Delusional Politics: Back To The Future (Publisher: Penguin Viking, 2018)

Articles
 "Libya: Hillary Clinton, Susan Rice and the Ghost of Rwanda" (Publisher: The Globalist, 2016)

See also
Manjeev Singh Puri
Navtej Sarna
Taranjit Singh Sandhu

References

External links

 

|-

1952 births
Living people
Politicians from Amritsar
Indian civil servants
Indian officials of the United Nations
Permanent Representatives of India to the United Nations
Indian Sikhs
Ambassadors of India to Brazil
High Commissioners of India to the United Kingdom
Bharatiya Janata Party politicians from Punjab
Narendra Modi ministry
People from Delhi